Denis Daly (died 1965) was an Irish Fianna Fáil politician. He was first elected as a Fianna Fáil Teachta Dála (TD) at the 1933 general election for the Kerry constituency. He served one term and did not contest the 1937 general election.

References

Year of birth missing
1965 deaths
Fianna Fáil TDs
Members of the 8th Dáil
Politicians from County Kerry